Tachypompilus is a genus of spider wasps, found in the Neotropics  Nearctic, eastern Palearctic, Indomalayan and Afrotropics.

Species
The species included in Tachypompilius include:

Tachypompilus analis (Fabricius, 1781) red-tailed spider wasp
Tachypompilus atratus (Colomo de Correa, 1985)
Tachypompilus banksi (Colomo de Correa, 1985)
Tachypompilus erubescens (Taschenberg, 1869)
Tachypompilus ferrugineus (Say, 1824) rusty spider wasp
Tachypompilus gracilis (Colomo de Correa, 1985)
Tachypompilus ignitus (Smith, 1855) rain spider wasp
Tachypompilus larssoni (Kurczewski, 2007)
Tachypompilus latus (Smith)
Tachypompilus mendozae (Dalla Torre, 1897) 
Tachypompilus ovambo (Arnold, 1937)
Tachypompilus pallidus (Banks, 1947)
Tachypompilus praepotens (Kohl, 1894)
Tachypompilus rubiginosus (Taschenberg)
Tachypompilus torridus (Cresson)
Tachypompilus unicolor (Banks, 1919) red-tailed spider hunter
Tachypompilus vitripennis (Arnold, 1937)
Tachypompilus vulpes (Dalla Torre)
Tachypompilus xanthopterus (Rohwer, 1913)

References

Pompilinae
Hymenoptera genera